"Kill All Hippies" is a song by Scottish rock band Primal Scream, released on 20 March 2000 as the second single from their sixth studio album, XTRMNTR. The song has an aggressive, electronically processed sound, with prominent use of sampled drum loops and distorted guitars. Its title is a quote from the 1980 film Out of the Blue, and begins with a sample of the line and other quotes from the film spoken by actress Linda Manz. Upon release, the song debuted and peaked at number 24 on the UK Singles Chart and spent one more week in the top 100 before dropping out.

Reception
Reviewing a live show from the XTRMNTR tour, Guardian critic Dave Simpson compared the song to the work of D.A.F.

Music video
A video for the song was directed by Julian Gibbs and Julian House, inspired by House's cover art for the album. It features fragmented footage of approaching war, aggression and combat, such as riot police, vintage military aircraft and hockey players, superimposed on backgrounds of intense blue and orange colour washes, with no faces visible. Several versions were made for different mixes of the album.

Track listing

Charts

References

External links
 Kill All Hippies video - website of video production team. Includes commentary and embedded clip of a longer mix.
 Video on band YouTube page, also of longer mix.
 Short mix, video on band YouTube page

Songs about hippies
2000 singles
2000 songs
Astralwerks singles
Creation Records singles
Primal Scream songs
Songs written by Andrew Innes
Songs written by Bobby Gillespie